Edo Flego (born 27 July 1975) is a retired Croatian football player.

Playing career

Club
During his career, he spent two seasons playing in the Croatian First Football League with HNK Rijeka. He also spent one season in the Slovenian PrvaLiga with NK Primorje and five seasons in the Croatian Second Football League.

Managerial career
Following his retirement in 2012 he has been working as a manager. He was appointed Director of HNK Rijeka Academy in June 2016.

He was later rehired by Orijent but dismissed by the club in May 2022.

References

1975 births
Living people
Footballers from Rijeka
Association football forwards
Croatian footballers
HNK Orijent players
HNK Rijeka players
NK Pomorac 1921 players
Al-Ittihad Kalba SC players
NK Hrvatski Dragovoljac players
NK Croatia Sesvete players
NK Primorje players
NK Jadran Poreč players
NK Grobničan players
NK Krk players
First Football League (Croatia) players
Croatian Football League players
UAE Pro League players
Croatian expatriate footballers
Expatriate footballers in Austria
Croatian expatriate sportspeople in Austria
Expatriate footballers in the United Arab Emirates
Croatian expatriate sportspeople in the United Arab Emirates
Expatriate footballers in Slovenia
Croatian expatriate sportspeople in Slovenia
Croatian football managers
HNK Orijent managers
HNK Rijeka non-playing staff